The National Union of General Workers (NUGW) is the shortened, English title of the National Union of General Workers National Council (全国一般労働組合全国協議会 Zenkoku Ippan Roudou Kumiai Zenkoku Kyogikai), a national labour union council established in 1991. NUGW is affiliated to the National Trade Union Council (全国労働組合連絡協議会 Zenrokyo), the smallest of the three national labour federations in Japan. As of September 2010 the NUGW had around 7000 members.

The NUGW acts as an umbrella organization encompassing roughly 40 autonomous general unions and trade unions, including the National Union of General Workers Tokyo Nambu (often referred to as simply Nambu), a union which represents workers in southern Tokyo and Eastern Japan; the National Union of General Workers, Tokyo (also known as Tokyo Union), which represents parts of Tokyo and Saitama Prefecture, the General Union, headquartered in Osaka, representing Western Japan, and the Fukuoka General Union, representing Kyūshū.

The union works to raise awareness of problems faced by all workers in Japan, including foreign/migrant workers, to improve members' working conditions and bargaining power and to inform members of their rights under Japanese labour law. Activities include strikes, rallies and leafleting, filing injunctions and arguing cases at Labour Commissions and District Courts on issues such as fixed-term contracts, the non-enrollment of employees into Social Insurance, illegal outsourcing of Assistant Language Teachers by public schools, and unfair dismissals due to one-year contracts.

References

See also
 Labor unions in Japan
 Zenrokyo
 General Union
 University Teachers Union

Trade unions in Japan
Trade unions established in 1991
1991 establishments in Japan